Crown of England may refer to:

 The Crown
 Crown Jewels of the United Kingdom
 Monarchy of the United Kingdom

See also
 List of English monarchs